Cham Lavand (also Romanized as Cham-e Lavand and Chamlovand) is a village in Dasht-e Lali Rural District, in the Central District of Lali County, Khuzestan Province, Iran. At the 2006 census, its population was 89, in 17 families.

References 

Populated places in Lali County